Columbia is a home rule-class city just above Russell Creek in Adair County, Kentucky, in the United States. The population was 4,452 at the 2010 census. Columbia is the seat of its county.

History

The area was settled  by Daniel Trabue. The post office was opened on April 1, 1806, by John Field, who also ran the local store.

Camp Boyle, located north of the town square, was an important camp and muster site for the Union Army during the Civil War (1861-1865). The 13th Kentucky Cavalry Regiment (Union) was organized in Columbia.

Geography
Columbia is located at  (37.100652, −85.306056).

According to the United States Census Bureau, the city has a total area of 3.4 square miles (8.9 km2), all land.

Demographics

As of the census of 2010, there were 4,014 people, 1,554 households, and 893 families residing in the city. The racial makeup of the city was 88.77% White, 7.68% African American, 0.25% Native American, 0.52% Asian, 0.07% Pacific Islander, 0.20% from other races, and 1.64% from two or more races. Hispanic or Latino of any race were 1.93% of the population. Some other race alone 1.08%

There were 1,554 households, out of which 24.8% had children under the age of 18 living with them, 39.9% were married couples living together, 14.5% had a female householder with no husband present, and 42.5% were non-families. 40.3% of all households were made up of individuals living alone, and 22.1% had someone living alone who was 65 years of age or older. The average household size was 2.12 and the average family size was 2.84.

In the city, the population was spread out, with 18.0% under the age of 18, 19.1% from 20 to 24, 23.1% from 25 to 44, 19.1% from 45 to 64, and 20.6% who were 65 years of age or older. The median age was 36 years. For every 100 females, there were 83.8 males. For every 100 females age 18 and over, there were 78.6 males.

The median income for a household in the city was $22,861, and the median income for a family was $31,344. Males had a median income of $23,906 versus $21,000 for females. The per capita income for the city was $17,836. About 19.9% of families and 26.6% of the population were below the poverty line, including 39.4% of those under age 18 and 17.9% of those age 65 or over.

Arts and culture

Events
Events held in Columbia, Kentucky:
 Downtown Days, two-day festival on the streets of downtown Columbia. The event includes a parade, a beauty pageant, reenactment of the James/Younger Bank of Columbia robbery, 5-K run, pet show, train rides for the kids, kids carnival, face painting, inflatables, live entertainment, food, fun, clowns, choirs, and more.
 To The Nines, a nearly monthly shopping event held in downtown Columbia. All businesses downtown stay open until 9 P.M. and usually offer discounted prices on their merchandise.

Education

Public schools
Columbia Public Schools are part of the Adair County Schools School District. Schools in the district include:

 Adair County Elementary School (3rd, 4th, 5th Grade Students from County)
 Adair County Primary School ( Pre-School, Kindergarten, 1st,& 2nd Grade Students from County)
 Adair County Middle School (6th, 7th, & 8th Grade Students)
 Adair County High School (9th-12 Grade Students)

Colleges and universities
Lindsey Wilson College, a private four-year college.

Public library
Columbia has a lending library, the Adair County Public Library.

Media
Media in Columbia include:
 The Adair Progress, a local 2x weekly newspaper
 WAIN (AM), a sports radio station
 WAIN-FM, a country radio station
 Adair County Community Voice, a local once weekly newspaper complete with Public Records information
 Columbia Magazine, an online-only magazine updated daily with local news and history.

Infrastructure
The Louie B. Nunn Cumberland Parkway runs through Columbia as it extends from Bowling Green to Somerset. This parkway is a future corridor of Interstate 66. The addition of an interchange with a 2006 reconstruction of Highway 61 South, Columbia now has two exits on the Parkway.

Exit 49, the original exit on the parkway, merges onto Highway 55 South (also known as Jamestown Street) bringing drivers through the middle of Columbia.

Exit 47, the new exit, merges onto Highway 61 South (also known as Burkesville Street/Road) and drivers can choose to go north or go to Burkesville to the south.

The Highway 55 Bypass was officially opened on October 7, 2008, for more information see below.

Columbia Bypass
After years of promises by various governors and other Kentucky officials, construction began early in May 2007, which culminated in an official ground-breaking ceremony by the former Governor himself on May 15, 2007  near the front of the newly constructed Adair County Elementary School, which faces the direction of the bypass.

The Columbia Bypass was opened to the public on October 7, 2008 featuring a traffic light at the intersection of the bypass and North 55 as well as a traffic light at the intersection of South 61. The bypass has relieved a majority of the downtown traffic.

Notable people

 Walter Arnold Baker – state legislator and Kentucky Supreme Court justice
 Steve Hamilton- Major League Baseball pitcher (1935–1997)
 Vernie McGaha – Kentucky state senator from Adair County since 1997
 Marine Sergeant Dakota Meyer – In September 2011, he received the Medal of Honor from President Barack Obama at age 23; he saved numerous American and Afghan troops during a Taliban ambush and is the third living recipient of the honor (and first living Marine) from the Iraq and Afghan wars 
 Doug Moseley – United Methodist clergyman and a member of the Kentucky State Senate from 1974 to 1987; former Columbia resident
 Frank Lane Wolford – U.S. Congressman (1883–1887)
 James Alexander Williamson – American Civil War Brevet Major General and Medal of Honor recipient
 Lance Burton – American stage magician

In popular culture
Columbia, Kentucky was depicted in the film Resurrection Mary starring Wilford Brimley in 2002.  The film was directed by another Columbia native, Matthew Eric Arnold as part of the USC School of Cinematic Arts graduate thesis program and won awards at the Big Bear Lake International Film Festival. The filming was featured on local news stations and in USA Today.

References

External links
 Columbia Magazine
 County Map from Kentucky Gazetteer

Cities in Adair County, Kentucky
Cities in Kentucky
County seats in Kentucky
1802 establishments in Kentucky
Populated places established in 1802